Pattuthoovaala is a 1965 Indian Malayalam-language film,  directed and produced by P. Subramaniam. The film stars Madhu, Sheela, Adoor Bhasi and Kanchana (old). The film had musical score by G. Devarajan.

Cast

Madhu
Sheela
Adoor Bhasi
Kanchana (old)
Kottarakkara Sreedharan Nair
Laila
Nellikode Bhaskaran
Pankajavalli
Philomina
S. P. Pillai
K. V. Shanthi

Soundtrack
The music was composed by G. Devarajan with lyrics by Vayalar Ramavarma.

References

External links
 

1965 films
1960s Malayalam-language films
Films directed by P. Subramaniam